Bernard Arthur Gordon Horsfall (20 November 1930 – 28 January 2013) was an English actor of stage and screen.

Early life
Horsfall was born in Bishop's Stortford, Hertfordshire, and educated at Rugby School. He trained as an actor at the Webber Douglas Academy of Dramatic Art.

Career
Horsfall appeared in many television and film roles, including the title role in Campion (1959-1960), Pathfinders to Mars (1960), the second sequel to Target Luna, Guns at Batasi (1964), The Avengers (three episodes in 1966 and 1967), On Her Majesty's Secret Service (1969), Beasts, as Sir Christopher Hatton in the 1971 BBC miniseries Elizabeth R, Enemy at the Door (ITV, 1978–1980), Gandhi (1982), an episode of The Jewel in the Crown (ITV, 1984), the character Frankland in The Hound of the Baskervilles (ITV, 1988), and the character Balliol in Braveheart (1995). His other roles included portraying British barrister Melford Stevenson in a 1980 Granada Television dramatisation of the 1955 case of Ruth Ellis.

Horsfall made several guest appearances in the BBC science fiction television series Doctor Who. His first was as Lemuel Gulliver in The Mind Robber (1968). His other appearances were as a Time Lord in The War Games (1969), Taron in Planet of the Daleks (1973), and Chancellor Goth (intended to be the same character as he played in The War Games) in The Deadly Assassin (1976). All four of these serials were directed by David Maloney. Many years later he returned to Doctor Who, appearing in Davros – a Doctor Who audio drama produced by Big Finish Productions.

Horsfall also appeared, with a Swedish accent, as Christianson in an episode of The Persuaders! entitled "The Morning After" during 1972.

His stage work included performances at The Old Vic, with the Royal Shakespeare Company and at the National Theatre.

Death
Horsfall died on 28 January 2013, aged 82, on the Isle of Skye in Scotland. He was survived by his wife Jane, their daughters Hannah and Rebecca, five grandchildren and his sister. His son Christian died in 2012.

Selected filmography
 The Steel Bayonet (1957) – Pvt. Livingstone
 The Admirable Crichton (1957) – Lifeboatman (uncredited)
 High Flight (1957) – Radar Operator
 The One That Got Away (1957) – Lieutenant – Kent (uncredited)
 The Angry Silence (1960) – Pryce-Evans
 Man in the Moon (1960) – Rex
 Guns at Batasi (1964) – Sgt. 'Schoolie' Prideaux
 On Her Majesty's Secret Service (1969) – Shaun Campbell
 Mr. Horatio Knibbles (1971) – Mr. Bunting
 Quest for Love (1971) – Telford
 Some Kind of Hero (1972) – George Crane
 Gold (1974) – Dave Kowalski
 Shout at the Devil (1976) – Captain Joyce
 Brass Target (1978) – Shelley
 Inside the Third Reich (1982) – Fritz Todt
 Gandhi (1982) – Gen. Edgar
 Braveheart (1995) – Balliol
 Stone of Destiny (2008) – Archdeacon (final film role)

References

External links

1930 births
2013 deaths
Alumni of the Webber Douglas Academy of Dramatic Art
English male film actors
English male Shakespearean actors
English male stage actors
English male television actors
Male actors from Hertfordshire
People educated at Rugby School
People from Bishop's Stortford
Royal Shakespeare Company members